Eric Lampe (born March 31, 1986) is an American former professional ice hockey player. He last played for Eispiraten Crimmitschau in the DEL2.

Playing career
Prior to turning professional, Lampe attended Quinnipiac University where he played four seasons of NCAA Division I college hockey with the Quinnipiac Bobcats men's ice hockey team.

After two seasons as an ECHL All-Star with the Las Vegas Wranglers, Lampe signed a one-year contract abroad with Oji Eagles of the Asia League Ice Hockey on August 9, 2013. In the 2013–14 season, Lampe established an elite partnership with North American teammate, and former Lake Erie Monster, Mike Kompon, to score 51 points in only 42 games.

On August 12, 2014, Lampe left Japan and signed a one-year contract with first division Italian club, HC Neumarkt-Egna. Aftrer just 14 games in the Italian league, Lampe left to sign in the German DEL2 league with ETC Crimmitschau.

Career statistics

Awards and honors

References

External links

1986 births
Living people
Sportspeople from Madison, Wisconsin
Chicago Steel players
Elmira Jackals (ECHL) players
ETC Crimmitschau players
Florida Everblades players
Hamilton Bulldogs (AHL) players
Lake Erie Monsters players
Las Vegas Wranglers players
Norfolk Admirals players
Oji Eagles players
Quinnipiac Bobcats men's ice hockey players
Syracuse Crunch players
American men's ice hockey forwards